Omie may be,

Ömie language
A nickname for Naomi, as in Omie Wise